Interval recognition, the ability to name and reproduce musical intervals, is an important part of ear training, music transcription, musical intonation and sight-reading.

Reference songs 
Some music teachers teach their students relative pitch by having them associate each possible interval with the first interval of a popular song. Such songs are known as "reference songs." However, others have shown that such familiar-melody associations are quite limited in scope, applicable only to the specific scale-degrees found in each melody.

Here are some examples for each interval:

In addition, there are various solmization systems (including solfeggio, sargam, and numerical sight-singing) that assign specific syllables to different notes of the scale. Among other things, this makes it easier to hear how intervals sound in different contexts, such as starting on different notes of the same scale.

References

Music-related lists
Ear training
Intervals (music)